The National Federation of Community Broadcasters (NFCB) is a national membership organization of community-oriented, non-commercial radio stations, media organizations and producers committed to community radio in the United States.

History 
NFCB was founded in 1975, out of meetings that began at the National Alternative Radio Conference that June, held in Madison, Wisconsin. The preceding years had seen an explosion of community radio stations, led largely by Lorenzo Milam, who founded Seattle radio station KRAB in 1963. These new stations included KBOO in Portland, WORT in Wisconsin and KGNU in Colorado, which were founding stations of NFCB. Around Milam's concept of "the right to be heard," community radio stations were established to provide access to the airwaves. Milam would join others in convening the NARC in 1975.

In Madison, the 75 Madison conveners held four days of meetings, exploring a variety of issues facing community radio stations and new licensees. A name, the League of Stations, was originally circulated. However, at a follow-up gathering dubbed The Constitutional Convention, held in Columbia, Mo. in August of the same year, attendees settled on Federation of Community Broadcasters, adding "National" in incorporation filings. The Delaware Secretary of State recorded the Articles of Incorporation for the National Federation of Community Broadcasters, Inc., on September 15, 1975.

NFCB's first office was in Washington, DC. It shortly thereafter opened an office called the Radio Program Exchange in Champaign, Ill. Due to financial hardships, NFCB leaders Tom Thomas and Terry Clifford left NFCB in 1984, closing one of the organization's most productive periods.

Carol Schatz succeeded Thomas and Clifford to become NFCB's second President in 1984. She departed NFCB in 1986. In 1987, Lynn Chadwick was selected to lead NFCB. According to NFCB: "NFCB relocated to San Francisco from Washington, DC in July 1995, and shared space with Western Public Radio, a non-profit radio training and production facility. Chadwick departed in 1998 and Carol Pierson became President and CEO. Maxie Jackson became NFCB’s leader when Carol Pierson retired in 2010. Jackson devoted his time at NFCB to developing the 5×5 model; a valuable tool for assessing and improving the capacity and effectiveness of stations and helping them develop best practices toward greater public service. Jackson was dismissed by NFCB's board of directors in 2013.

In 2014,  Sally Kane took the helm of NFCB with a mandate to identify the essential services needed for stations navigating the technological demands and opportunities of the digital age and severe economic downturn. Kane’s background leading a rural service network in western Colorado brings many years of experience in hands-on management grounded in core principles of serving the information needs of all the citizenry, particularly in areas with dispersed populations."

NFCB is today based in Denver, Colorado.

Activities 
The first decade of the organization included the creation of legal and training manuals for affiliate stations, helping stations acquire broadcast licenses and supporting the creation of local on-air services. It was the first organization to convene meetings in 1980 for minority radio producers. In 2016, NFCB was named among organizations bringing diversity to public media.

NFCB's legal handbook, introduced in the 1970s, is still updated and considered a key document for community radio stations. It offers a similar guide for underwriting.

NFCB advocates in various forums for community radio. Its early years saw leaders speaking before Congress about Federal Communications Commission and Corporation for Public Broadcasting rules.

NFCB hosts an annual conference for participants to discuss and teach skills in community radio.

Awards 
NFCB offers three annual awards, Volunteer of the Year, recognizing community radio volunteers; the Golden Torchlight, recognizing local impact; and the Michael Bader award, recognizing lifetime achievement.

The Bader award's namesake, attorney Michael Bader, was a lifelong counsel for community radio.

See also 

 Pacifica Foundation
 List of Pacifica Radio stations and affiliates
 List of community radio stations in the United States
 Grassroots Radio Coalition

References

External links
 NFCB's official web site
 National Federation of Community Broadcasters (NFCB) records at the University of Maryland Libraries 

Supraorganizations
Community radio in the United States
Community radio organizations